Russell Guy Wrightstone (March 18, 1893 in Bowmansdale, Pennsylvania – February 25, 1969 in Harrisburg, Pennsylvania) was a professional baseball player. He played nine seasons in Major League Baseball, from 1920–28, for the Philadelphia Phillies and New York Giants. He played six different positions, most often as a third baseman or first baseman. He hit .300 or better 5 times. In 1925 with the Phillies, he hit .346 and hit 14 home runs, both career highs. He drove in 75 runs and scored 62 runs in 1927, also career highs. He finished his career with the NY Giants in 1928.

Career Statistics

In 929 games played in nine seasons, Wrightstone compiled a .297 batting average (889-2992) with 427 runs, 152 doubles, 34 triples, 60 home runs, 425 RBI, 215 walks, .349 on-base percentage and .431 slugging percentage. His overall career fielding percentage was .966.

References

External links

Major League Baseball infielders
Philadelphia Phillies players
New York Giants (NL) players
Newark Bears (IL) players
Buffalo Bisons (minor league) players
Harrisburg Senators players
York White Roses players
Baseball players from Pennsylvania
1893 births
1969 deaths